The following highways are numbered 461:

Canada
Newfoundland and Labrador Route 461

Japan
 Japan National Route 461

United States
  Iowa Highway 461
  Kentucky Route 461
  Maryland Route 461
  New Mexico Highway 461
  Puerto Rico Highway 461
  Texas State Highway Loop 461